RV Profesor Siedlecki was a Polish fishery research ship built to carry out research in the southern polar waters. The research was aimed at the fisheries off the Falkland Islands down to 57S. The ship was named after the Polish zoologist Professor Michał Siedlecki, who died in the Sachsenhausen concentration camp. Its first cruise took place in 1974. Further expeditions were captained by Miron Babiak.
The ship was scrapped in 1992.

References

Research vessels of Poland
1970 ships